Pełczyska may refer to the following places:
Pełczyska, Łódź Voivodeship (central Poland)
Pełczyska, Zgierz County in Łódź Voivodeship (central Poland)
Pełczyska, Świętokrzyskie Voivodeship (south-central Poland)